Lars Hjortshøj (born 3 June 1967 in Hinnerup) is a Danish stand-up comedian and television and radio host.

He has taken part in many Danish shows, including Casper & Mandrilaftalen and in the sit-com Langt fra Las Vegas.

As of February 2006 Lars Hjortshøj is still co-host in Radio 100FM's morning show Morgenhyrderne along with Lasse Rimmer and Andrea Elisabeth Rudolph.

He appeared in a recurring role as a fictionalized version of himself in the Danish sit-com Klovn, playing one of the main characters Frank Hvam'''s colleagues, a stand-up comedian.

He is (as of 2008) the host of the US-adopted game show Sandhedens Time, in the US, it is called The Moment of Truth''

Lars and his wife live outside of Copenhagen with their two children.

External links
 

1967 births
Living people
Danish male comedians
Danish male television actors
Danish stand-up comedians
Danish radio presenters
People from Favrskov Municipality